Rother Valley is a constituency represented in the House of Commons of the UK Parliament by Alexander Stafford, a member of the Conservative Party.

History
This constituency was created by the Representation of the People Act 1918.  Unusually in the light of the events of the Labour Party's early 20th-century years, the seat had been represented by a member of that party continuously since the seat was formed. The size of the majorities historically have not been particularly marginal in the elections, until the 2017 general election in which the majority was less than 4,000 votes. Nonetheless, this was still considered a safe seat for the party, until the 2019 general election in which the Conservatives won the seat for the first time.

Boundaries 

1918–1949: The Urban Districts of Handsworth, and Swinton, and the Rural Districts of Kiveton Park, and part of Rotherham.

1950–1983: The Urban Districts of Maltby, and Rawmarsh, and the Rural Districts of Kiveton Park, and Rotherham.

Rother Valley constituency covers an area in the Metropolitan Borough of Rotherham south of Rotherham itself. It is bordered by the constituencies of Bassetlaw, Bolsover, Derbyshire North East, Don Valley, Rotherham, Sheffield South East, and Wentworth and Dearne.

Boundary review 
Parliament accepted the Boundary Commission's Fifth Periodic Review of Westminster constituencies which slightly altered this constituency for the 2010 general election since which it has electoral wards:
Anston and Woodsetts, Dinnington, Hellaby, Holderness, Maltby, Rother Vale, Sitwell, and Wales in the Metropolitan Borough of Rotherham

Constituency profile
The constituency consists of Census Output Areas of one local government district: a working population whose income is on average slightly below the national average and close to average reliance upon social housing.  At the end of 2012 the unemployment rate in the constituency stood as 4.0% of the population claiming jobseekers allowance, compared to the regional average of 4.7%.  This was considerably lower than the rate in the Rotherham constituency of 7% and 9.6% male unemployment.

The borough contributing to the seat has a relatively high 26.6% of its population without a car compared to 20.1% in Bassetlaw and 30.3% in Sheffield. In terms of extremes of education 29.8% of the population in 2011 were without qualifications contrasted with 17.4% with level 4 qualifications or above.

In terms of tenure 65.2% of homes are owned outright or on a mortgage as at the 2011 census across the borough.  In the 10 years to the April 2011 Census the social rented sector saw a 4.9% reduction and the private rented sector a 5.3% increase; outright ownership saw a 3.8% increase.

Members of Parliament

Elections

Elections in the 2010s

Elections in the 2000s

Elections in the 1990s

Elections in the 1980s

Elections in the 1970s

Elections in the 1960s

Elections in the 1950s

Elections in the 1940s

Elections in the 1930s

Elections in the 1920s

Elections in the 1910s

See also 
List of parliamentary constituencies in South Yorkshire

Notes

References

Sources 
BBC News, Election 2005
BBC News, Vote 2001
Guardian Unlimited Politics

Election results from 1951 to the present 
F. W. S. Craig, British Parliamentary Election Results 1918 - 1949
F. W. S. Craig, British Parliamentary Election Results 1950 - 1970

Parliamentary constituencies in Yorkshire and the Humber
Constituencies of the Parliament of the United Kingdom established in 1918
Politics of Rotherham